Eicochrysops messapus, the cupreous blue, is a butterfly of the family Lycaenidae. It is found in Africa. In South Africa it is rare and only known from the northern part of the Limpopo province and northern KwaZulu-Natal.

The wingspan is 17–22 mm for males and 17–24 mm for females. Adults are on wing year-round in warmer areas, with peaks in October and March. In cooler areas it is not found from April to September.

The larvae probably feed on Thesium species.

Subspecies

E. m. messapus — South Africa: Western Cape to Free State provinces
E. m. mahallakoeana (Wallengren, 1857) — South Africa: northern Eastern Cape to KwaZulu-Natal, northern Free State, Mpumalanga, Gauteng, Limpopo and North West provinces
E. m. nandiana (Bethune-Baker, 1906) — Kenya, Uganda
E. m. sebagadis (Guérin-Méneville, 1849) — highlands of Ethiopia

References

Butterflies described in 1824
Eicochrysops